Carl Johan "Loa" Falkman (born 24 July 1947) is a Swedish opera singer, actor and artist. He was appointed hovsångare by H.M. the King of Sweden in 2003.

After studying music, Falkman made his first major performance on the Royal Swedish Opera in 1973.

In Melodifestivalen 1990 (Swedish preselection contest for the Eurovision Song Contest), Falkman got the last place with his song "Symfonin" ("The Symphony"). He often plays pompous, vile characters like Wall-Enberg in Lilla Jönssonligan, Tillström in Newsmakers or Factory Owner Persson in Kronjuvelerna.

Filmography
2011 – Kronjuvelerna
2009 – Newsmakers
2006 – Lilla Jönssonligan & stjärnkuppen
2006 – 7 miljonärer
2004 – Lilla Jönssonligan på kollo
1999 – Dödsklockan
1997 – Lilla Jönssonligan på styva linan
1996 – Lilla Jönssonligan och cornflakeskuppen
1995 – Like It Never Was Before
1991 – T. Sventon och fallet Isabella
1986 – Bröderna Mozart
1984 – Åke och hans värld

TV series
2008 – Om ett hjärta 
2007 – Ett gott parti 
2006 – Nisse Hults historiska snedsteg
2005 – Kommissionen
2002 – Cleo
2002 – Talismanen
2001 – Fru Marianne
1996 – Percy Tårar
1991 – Facklorna

Voiceover
2004 – Kogänget
2002 – Ice Age

Opera
2010 – Don Giovanni
1988 – Askungen
1985 – Maskeradbalen
1980 – Arresten på Bohus
1973 – Tintomara

Discography 

 Symfonin (1990)
 Julstämning (1990)
 Loa On Broadway (1995)
 Stockholmskantat (1999)
 Strangers In The Night (2001)
 Kom i min famn – Loa Falkman sjunger Evert Taube (2012)
 Jul (2013)

References

External links 

Biography: Carl Johan Falkman on Ann Braathen Artist Management AB
Falkman, Carl Johan on Operissimo
 

Swedish operatic baritones
Litteris et Artibus recipients
Musicians from Stockholm County
People from Danderyd Municipality
1947 births
Living people
20th-century Swedish  male opera singers
20th-century Swedish male actors
21st-century Swedish male actors
21st-century Swedish male opera singers
Best Actor Guldbagge Award winners
Stockholm University of the Arts alumni
Melodifestivalen contestants of 1990